Estadio Marcelino Imbers is a multi-use stadium in La Unión, La Unión, El Salvador.  It is currently used mostly for football matches and is the home stadium of C.D. Atlético Balboa.  The stadium holds 4,000 people.

External links
https://web.archive.org/web/20100912105650/http://www.cdatleticobalboa.com/estadio.html

Football venues in El Salvador
Sports venues completed in 1999
1999 establishments in El Salvador